Vriesea gigantea is a plant species in the genus Vriesea. This species is endemic to Brazil.

Cultivars
 Vriesea 'Casper'
 Vriesea 'Daintree Forest'
 Vriesea 'Debra Jones'
 Vriesea 'Elfi'
 Vriesea 'Goblin'
 Vriesea 'Green Jade'
 Vriesea 'Jolly Green Giant'
 Vriesea 'Lavender Lady'
 Vriesea 'Lemon Lime & Bitters'
 Vriesea 'Majestic Beauty'
 Vriesea 'Mortfontanensis'
 Vriesea 'Painted Canyon'
 Vriesea 'Roberto Kautsky'
 Vriesea 'Robusta'
 Vriesea 'San Miguel'
 Vriesea 'Snow In Summer'
 Vriesea 'Snowman'
 Vriesea 'The Daintree'
 Vriesea 'Wyee Point'
 Vriesea 'Zapita'

References

BSI Cultivar Registry Retrieved 11 October 2009

gigantea
Flora of Brazil